Sachia Vickery was the defending champion, but chose not to participate.

Asia Muhammad won the title, defeating Sesil Karatantcheva in the final, 2–6, 6–4, 6–3.

Seeds

Draw

Finals

Top half

Bottom half

References
Main Draw

Central Coast Pro Tennis Open - Singles